Katherinne Mary Angel Wollermann Zapata (born 12 August 1992) is a Chilean paracanoeist who competes in international level events.

References

1992 births
Living people
People from Concepción Province, Chile
Chilean female canoeists
People with paraplegia
Paracanoeists at the 2016 Summer Paralympics
Paracanoeists at the 2020 Summer Paralympics
Medalists at the 2020 Summer Paralympics
Paralympic medalists in paracanoe
Paralympic bronze medalists for Chile
21st-century Chilean women